Lloyd in Space is an American animated television series that ran on ABC from February 3, 2001 to February 16, 2002, and then on Toon Disney from October 1, 2002 to February 27, 2004. All the episodes are directed by Howy Parkins.

Series overview

Episodes

Season 1 (2001)

Season 2 (2001–02)

Season 3 (2002)

Season 4 (2003–04)

External links
 
 

Lloyd in Space
Lists of Disney Channel television series episodes
Lists of Disney television series episodes